Peter Heller may refer to:

 Pete Heller, English electronic and house music producer
 Peter W. Heller (born 1957), German politician, environmental scientist, and venture philanthropist
 Peter Heller (academic) (1920–1998), Austrian-American academic and 1982 Guggenheim Fellowship winner
 Peter Heller (physicist), 1972 Guggenheim Fellowship winner
 Peter Heller (tennis), German tennis player
 Peter Heller, author of the 2012 novel The Dog Stars
 Peter Heller, producer of the 2006 film Dreamland